The 1950 Marshall Thundering Herd football team was an American football team that represented Marshall University in the Ohio Valley Conference (OVC) during the 1950 college football season. In its first season under head coach Pete Pederson, the team compiled a 2–8 record (1–4 against conference opponents) and was outscored by a total of 249 to 107. Earl Sang was the team captain. The team played its home games at Fairfield Stadium in Huntington, West Virginia.

Schedule

References

Marshall
Marshall Thundering Herd football seasons
Marshall Thundering Herd football